The Francolu is a coastal stream in the southeast of the department of Corse-du-Sud, Corsica, France.

Course

It flows through the commune of Bonifacio.
The stream rises to the south of the hamlet of Sapareddi.
It flows with wide loops in a generally south-southeast direction, passes under the T10 coastal road, and enters the Étang de Balistra, a lagoon.
The lagoon drains into the sea through a channel at the north end of the Plage de Balistra.

Where the Ruisseau de Francolo enters the lagoon through a swamp there is an extensive sansouire (salt-tolerant grasses) mixed with spiny rush and sea rush.
Shorebirds frequent this area.
The open water is used by great cormorants and great crested grebes, and sometimes by diving ducks.
The Köppen climate classification is Csa : Hot-summer Mediterranean climate.

Hydrology

Measurements of the river flow were taken at the Balistra station from 1969 to 1980.

Tributaries
The following streams (ruisseaux) are tributaries of the Francolu (ordered by length) and sub-tributaries:

 Truone: 
 Riccinu: 
 Canale d'Oru: 
 Stencia: 
 Rotonda: 
 Saparelli:

Notes

Sources

Rivers of Corse-du-Sud
Rivers of France
Coastal basins of the Tyrrhenian Sea in Corsica